This is a list of therapeutic, diagnostic and preventive monoclonal antibodies, antibodies that are clones of a single parent cell. When used as drugs, the International Nonproprietary Names (INNs) end in -mab. The remaining syllables of the INNs, as well as the column Source, are explained in Nomenclature of monoclonal antibodies.

The abbreviations in the column Type are as follows:
 mab: whole monoclonal antibody
 Fab: fragment, antigen-binding (one arm)
 F(ab')2: fragment, antigen-binding, including hinge region (both arms)
 Fab': fragment, antigen-binding, including hinge region (one arm)
 Variable fragments:
 scFv: single-chain variable fragment
 di-scFv: dimeric single-chain variable fragment
 sdAb: single-domain antibody
 BsMAb: bispecific monoclonal antibodies:
 3funct: trifunctional antibody
 BiTE: bi-specific T-cell engager

This list of over 500 monoclonal antibodies includes approved and investigational drugs as well as drugs that have been withdrawn from market; consequently, the column Use does not necessarily indicate clinical usage. See the list of FDA-approved therapeutic monoclonal antibodies in the monoclonal antibody therapy page.

References

Monoclonal Antibodies
+
Monoclonal Antibodies